Centre Street station is a stop in downtown Calgary on the city's CTrain light rail system. It is only used by eastbound trains, with the nearest stations serving westbound trains being 1 Street Southwest station (serving only eastbound trains) and City Hall, serving both directions. The platform is located on the south side of 7 Avenue South, east of Centre Street, and is located inside the free fare zone serving both routes 201 and 202.

The original Centre Street station opened on May 25, 1981, as part of Calgary's first LRT line from 8 Street W to Anderson and was located between 1 Street SW & Centre Street. The station was relocated one block east between Centre Street & 1 Street SE to coincide with the Telus Convention Center Redevelopment and opened on May 30, 2000. This was not part of the 7 Avenue Refurbishment and the station was constructed to three-car length with room to easily expand to four-car length when needed in the future. Construction of the platform extension at Centre Street station was completed in early 2012.

All of the 7 Avenue Refurbished Stations that followed in 2005–2012 use the same basic design as Centre Street where the entire sidewalk slopes up to platform level. However, the canopy design at Centre Street is slightly different from the newer stations constructed in 2005 and onwards.

The Telus Convention Centre, Glenbow Museum, and the Calgary Tower are located near these platforms, as are skyscrapers such as the Suncor Energy Centre, Scotia Centre and Bow Valley Square.

In 2005 the station registered an average of 11,200 weekday boardings.

References 

CTrain stations
Railway stations in Canada opened in 1981